The Federal University,  Kashere, also known as FUKashere, is a public conventional university situated in North Eastern part of Nigeria.  The recently established university is situated in the small city of Kashere an administrative territory of Pindiga, Akko local government in Gombe State Nigeria. It was established in 2010 by Goodluck Jonathan administration as one of the nine new federal universities created in the six geo-political zones of Nigeria. The university was established in the bid to increase access to education and also to ensure equity among all the States in Nigeria. The university is  recently running 6 faculties and many courses which would be listed below. The faculties are : Faculty of Education, Faculty Of Science, Faculty Of Humanities, Faculty Of Agriculture, Faculty Of Management Sciences, and Faculty Art and Social Sciences.

Courses 
The following are the courses offered in Federal University of Kashere

 ACCOUNTANCY/ACCOUNTING.
 AGRICULTURAL SCIENCE AND EDUCATION.
 APPLIED GEOPHYSICS.
 ARABIC STUDIES.
 BIOCHEMISTRY.
 BIOLOGY.
 BUSINESS ADMINISTRATION.
 CHEMISTRY.
 CHRISTIAN RELIGIOUS STUDIES.
 COMPUTER SCIENCE.
 ECONOMICS.
 ECONOMICS AND DEVELOPMENT STUDIES.
 EDUCATION AND ARABIC.
 EDUCATION AND BIOLOGY.
 CRIMINOLOGY AND SECURITY STUDIES.
 EDUCATION AND CHEMISTRY.
 EDUCATION AND COMPUTER SCIENCE.
 ENTREPRENEURSHIP.
 EDUCATION AND ECONOMICS.
 EDUCATION AND ENGLISH LANGUAGE.
 GUIDANCE AND COUNSELLING.
 EDUCATION AND GEOGRAPHY.
 EDUCATION AND HAUSA.
 HISTORY AND DIPLOMATIC STUDIES.
 EDUCATION AND HISTORY.
 EDUCATION AND INTEGRATED SCIENCE.
 INTERNATIONAL RELATIONS.
 EDUCATION AND MATHEMATICS.
 EDUCATION AND PHYSICS.
 ENGLISH LANGUAGE.
 EDUCATION AND POLITICAL SCIENCE.
 EDUCATIONAL ADMINISTRATION AND PLANNING.
 GEOGRAPHY.
 HAUSA.
POLITICAL SCIENCE 
INTERNATIONAL RELATIONS￼

Vice Chancellor 
The current vice- chancellor is Professor Umar Pate. He succeeded Prof. Alhassan Gani, whose single term tenure of five years expired on February 10, 2021

Professor Muhammad Alhassan Gani 

Professor Mohammed Kabiru Faruk

Ranking 
According to webometrics, Federal University of Kashere Ranking is analysed below;

References

External links 
http://fukashere.edu.ng/

Federal universities of Nigeria
2010 establishments in Nigeria
Educational institutions established in 2010
Schools in Gombe State